Cheating, Inc. is a 1991 short, non-dialogue comedic silent film about a class of students cheating on their exam. The film was an official selection of the 1992 Cannes Film Festival.

Crew
 William Lorton, Director / Writer / Sound
 Erik Porter, Camera / Editor
 Matthew Peterson, Original Music
 Derek Purcell, Production Design

Cast
Ken Jones
Derek Purcell
Jonathan Fish
Gregory Bernstein
Robert Weston
John Randall
Todd M. Guyette
Gary Rubenstein
Carlos Medrano de Anda
Jared Bushansky

Behind the Scenes

 The entire film was made at The University of Southern California, Los Angeles, California, campus.
 USC CNTV 310 class, in which the film was made, required students to complete an eight-minute, non-dialogue 16mm black and white project over an eight-week period.
 16mm / BW / Mono Optical Track / 8min 30 sec / 1.33:1 Academy Ratio

Articles in the Media

Article:  11 May 1992:  "A Taste of the Big Time at Cannes" by Kenneth Turan, Los Angeles Times
Article:  20 April 1992:  "US Comes on Strong at Cannes" by Pia Farrell, The Hollywood Reporter

External links

 Official Cheating, Inc. website

1991 short films
1991 films
American student films
1991 comedy films
American comedy short films
1990s English-language films
1990s American films
Silent comedy films